The East Prigorodny conflict, also referred to as the Ossetian–Ingush conflict, was an inter-ethnic conflict in the eastern part of the Prigorodny District in the Republic of North Ossetia–Alania, which started in 1989 and developed, in 1992, into a brief ethnic war between local Ingush and Ossetian paramilitary forces.

Origins of the conflict

Imperial and early Soviet era 
The present conflict emerges from the policies of both Imperial and Soviet governments, which exploited ethnic differences to further their own ends, namely the perpetuation of central rule and authority. Tsarist policy in the North Caucasus generally favored Ossetians, who inhabited an area astride the strategically important Georgian Military Highway, a key link between Russia proper and her Transcaucasian colonies. 

In addition, the Ossetians were one of the few friendly peoples in a region that for much of the nineteenth century bitterly resisted Russian rule; a majority of Ossetians shared the same Eastern Orthodox Christian faith with Russians (while a minority are Sunni Muslim), while the majority of the other ethnic groups of the North Caucasus were Muslim. Russian authorities also conducted population transfers of native people in the area at will and brought in large numbers of Terek Cossacks. 

Under the Soviets, local Cossacks (many of the early members of the Terek Cossacks were Ossetians) were punished for their support of anti-Soviet White forces during the Russian Civil War (1918–1921) and banished from the area, including from the Prigorodnyi region which was given to the Ingush, ostensibly for their support of the Red or Bolshevik forces during the conflict. Soviet administrators often arbitrarily created territorial units in the North Caucasus, thereby enhancing differences by splitting apart like peoples or fostering dependence by uniting different groups.

In January 1920, the Autonomous Mountain Soviet Socialist Republic, referred to as the "Mountaineers Republic," was formed, with its capital in Vladikavkaz. Initially, the "Mountaineers Republic," included the Kabards, Chechens, Ingush, Ossetians, Karachai, Cherkess, and Balkars, but it quickly began to disintegrate and new territorial units were created. In 1924, the Ingush were given their own territorial unit that included the Prigorodnyi region. In 1934, the Ingush were merged territorially with the Chechens; in 1936 this territory was formed into the Checheno-Ingush ASSR with its capital in Grozny. The Prigorodnyi region still remained within the Chechen–Ingush entity.

In 1944, near the end of World War II, the Ingush and the Chechen peoples were accused of collaborating with the Nazis, and by order of Joseph Stalin, the whole population of Ingush and Chechens were deported to Central Asia and Siberia. Soon after, the depopulated Prigorodny district was transferred to North Ossetia.

Post-WW2 tensions and Soviet collapse 

In 1957, the repressed Ingush and Chechens were allowed to return to their native land and the Checheno-Ingush Republic was restored, with the Prigorodny district maintained as part of North Ossetia. Soviet authorities attempted to prevent Ingush from returning to their territory in Prigorodny district; however, Ingush families managed to move in, purchase houses back from the Ossetians and resettled the district in greater numbers. 

This gave rise to the idea of "restoring historical justice" and "returning native lands", among the Ingush population and intelligence, which contributed to the already existing tensions between ethnic Ossetians and Ingush. Between 1973 and 1980 the Ingush voiced their demands for the reunification of the Prigorodny district with Ingushetia by staging various protests and meetings in Grozny.

The tensions increased in early 1991, during the collapse of the Soviet Union, when the Ingush openly declared their rights to the Prigorodny district according to the Soviet law adopted by the Supreme Soviet of the USSR on April 26, 1991; in particular, the third and the sixth article on "territorial rehabilitation." The law gave the Ingush legal grounds for their demands, which caused serious turbulence in a region in which many people had free access to weapons, resulting in an armed conflict between ethnic Ingush population of the Prigorodny district and Ossetian armed militias from Vladikavkaz.

Armed conflict
Ethnic violence rose steadily in the area of the Prigorodny district, to the east of the Terek River, despite the introduction of 1,500 Soviet Internal Troops to the area.

During the summer and early autumn of 1992, there was a steady increase in the militancy of Ingush nationalists. At the same time, there was a steady increase in incidents of organized harassment, kidnapping and rape against Ingush inhabitants of North Ossetia by their Ossetian neighbours, police, security forces and militia. Ingush fighters marched to take control over Prigorodny District and on the night of October 30, 1992, open warfare broke out, which lasted for a week. The first people killed were respectively Ossetian and Ingush militsiya staff (as they had basic weapons). While Ingush militias were fighting the Ossetians in the district and on the outskirts of the North Ossetian capital Vladikavkaz, Ingush from elsewhere in North Ossetia were forcibly evicted and expelled from their homes. Russian OMON forces actively participated in the fighting and sometimes led Ossetian fighters into battle.

On October 31, 1992, armed clashes broke out between Ingush militias and North Ossetian security forces and paramilitaries supported by Russian Interior Ministry (MVD) and Army troops in the Prigorodny District of North Ossetia. Although Russian troops often intervened to prevent some acts of violence by Ossetian police and republican guards, the stance of the Russian peacekeeping forces was strongly pro-Ossetian, not only objectively as a result of its deployment, but subjectively as well. The fighting, which lasted six days, had at its root a dispute between ethnic Ingush and Ossetians over the Prigorodnyi region, a sliver of land of about 978 square kilometers over which both sides lay claim. That dispute has not been resolved, nor has the conflict. Both sides have committed human rights violations. Thousands of homes have been wantonly destroyed, most of them Ingush. More than one thousand hostages were taken on both sides, and as of 1996 approximately 260 individuals-mostly Ingush-remain unaccounted for, according to the Procuracy of the Russian Federation. Nearly five hundred individuals were killed in the first six days of conflict. Hostage-taking, shootings, and attacks on life and property continued at least until 1996. President Boris Yeltsin issued a decree that the Prigorodny district was to remain part of North Ossetia on November 2.

Casualties
Total dead as of June 30, 1994: 644.

Allegations of ethnic cleansing
Human Rights Watch/Helsinki takes no position on the ultimate status of the Prigorodnyi region. HRW's report says:

The pressure from Moscow and the Russian-mediated Ossetian–Ingush agreement of 1995 induced the North Ossetian authorities to allow Ingush refugees from four settlements in the Prigorodny district to return to their homes. The return of most refugees had been blocked by the local government and only the Ossetians had been able to return since. Meanwhile, the former Ingush homes and settlements in the district have been gradually occupied by the Ossetian refugees from Georgia.

It is estimated that between 1994 and 2008, around 25,000 of the Ingush people returned to Prigorodny District while some 7,500 remained in Ingushetia.

On October 11, 2002, the presidents of Ingushetia and North Ossetia signed an agreement "promoting cooperation and neighborly relations," in which Ingush refugees and human rights advocates invested much hope. However, the Beslan school siege of 2004 hampered the return process and worsened Ossetian–Ingush relations.

See also
 Georgian–Ossetian conflict

References

External links 
Getting back home? Towards sustainable return of Ingush forced migrants and lasting peace in Prigorodny district of North Ossetia

1992 in Russia
Conflicts in 1992
Ethnic cleansing in Europe
History of Ingushetia
History of North Ossetia–Alania
Massacres in Russia
Politics of Russia
Post-Soviet conflicts
Wars involving Russia